Leander Paes was the defending champion, but lost in the quarterfinals to Wayne Arthurs.

Chris Woodruff won the title by defeating Kenneth Carlsen 6–7(5–7), 6–4, 6–4 in the final.

Seeds

Draw

Finals

Top half

Bottom half

References

External links
 Official results archive (ATP)
 Official results archive (ITF)

1999 Hall of Fame Tennis Championships